Aditya Jha  is a Nepalese Canadian entrepreneur, philanthropist and social activist. A globetrotter, his business portfolio consists of several startups and company turnarounds with interests in Canada, India, Thailand and Nepal. He also runs several philanthropic initiatives through his Private Charitable Foundation (POA Educational Foundation), promoting education and nurturing entrepreneurship to increase opportunities for the less fortunate. Jha takes special interest in nurturing prosperity and financial independence amongst Canadian First Nations (aboriginal) communities and individuals through education scholarships at top Canadian universities and a project (Project Beyshick) that nurtures entrepreneurship. Jha is 2012 inductee to the Order of Canada, Canada's highest civilian award.

Early life 
Aditya Jha was born to a Nepali family in Madhuwa Village Mahottari, Nepal. His Mother tongue is Maithili. He was brought-up in a landed middle-class family of three brothers and two sisters. His father was a lawyer by profession and his mother was Indian from Sitamarhi district from where his father practiced law graduating from court of Sitamarhi, Bihar in India. Upon completion of his secondary education in a village near Indo-Nepal border, Aditya went on to pursue post-secondary education in Delhi, India. After receiving a bachelor's degree in sciences from Hans Raj College Delhi University, he went on to do M.Sc. Mathematical Statistics at Kurukshetra University and PG Diploma in Computer Science from Kurukshetra University. He further invested four and a half years from 1979 to 1984 as a Research Scholar at the School of Computer and Systems Sciences, Jawaharlal Nehru University before visiting Paris, France, for mainframe computer training with CIT Alcatel for six months. He was the recipient of the University Grants Commission's Junior and Senior scholarship and Research Associateship from the Council of Scientific and Industrial Research. He was very active in student politics and student union activities and worked underground with those working against when Emergency measures suspending democratic rights in India were promulgated. He played a leadership role with the largest student organization in India as General Secretary for Delhi and Haryana state and was on the National Executive of the national student organization when he was just 22 years old.

Career and business interests 
He started his career in India and then subsequently worked in Singapore, Australia and South East Asian countries. He migrated to Canada in late 1994 and joined Bell Canada, later becoming a General Manager. After a career at Bell, he co-founded (with four other partners) a software company, Isopia Inc. Isopia was a Canadian success story and their company was acquired by Sun Microsystems for over $100 million (combination of cash & stock). After his work at Isopia, Aditya started Osellus Inc, another software firm with offices in Toronto and Bangkok, and diversified his portfolio through acquisition of several businesses including a business from Allan Candy/Cadbury Adams Canada. He renamed the confectionery manufacturing business, to Karma Candy owing to his belief in the concept of Karma. After this acquisition, Aditya helped save more than 150 jobs who were to be laid-off owing to the imminent closure of one of the oldest confectionery factories in Canada. From 2013-2016, Aditya was the CEO of the Euclid Infotech (Tendersinfo.com).

dgMarket International Inc - International Tenders & E-Procurement 
In January 2017, Jha acquired dgMarket International Inc from Development Gateway. dgMarket is the oldest and one of the largest portal for tenders and consulting opportunities worldwide, with solicitations from national governments and international donor agencies.  It was created in 2001, as a part of Development Gateway (DG) at the initiative of the World Bank in an effort to enhancing the reach, transparency, and effectiveness of International procurement in economic improvement round the arena. dgMarket integrates about 1 million procurement notices per year, covering about $1 trillion tender opportunities.

Philanthropic interests 
Jha established a private Canadian charitable foundation, the POA Educational Foundation, in 2001, to promote education and entrepreneurship amongst the individuals and groups not so fortunate.

Educational projects in Canada
Aditya has several scholarships at Canadian post secondary institutions such as Ryerson University (now Toronto Metropolitan University), Trent University, George Brown College, Centennial College and York University. The endowments at these universities grant (annually $70,000) in total Twenty (20) scholarship/grants awards in perpetuity to students (large focus on students from the aboriginal community of Canada). Additionally he has supported a research project on Economic Value of Indo-Canadians (Ryerson University), Pathways Education Program for the inner-city kids of Regent Park community in Toronto and funded York University for Canada-India research initiative.

Projects promoting entrepreneurship in Canada
Jha's Project Beyshick initiative nurtures prosperity and financial independence amongst First Nations individuals by encouraging and mentoring entrepreneurial efforts. The project was launched with the support of Nishnawbe Aski Nation (NAN) Grand Chief Stan Beardy, nephew Ashutosh Jha and many others. The project has had numerous life changing positive impacts on participants, putting them on an accelerated path towards success and personal growth. Asked by a media house about his motivation for this initiative, he replied

I wanted to give the Canadian aboriginal communities a vision for the future - and a sense of possibility. It is the entrepreneurial spirit and success, which gives the rightful recognition to communities in the mainstream world. It also allows the successful entrepreneurs to become role models for their community,.

He has also supported award for the Top 20 under 20 program (Entrepreneurship category) and the yearly $15,000 Business Plan & $5,000 Career Plan Contest award for the First Nation individual participating in Project Beyshick.

Philanthropic work in Nepal

He has funded digital literacy project by donating laptop and desktops to 11 schools in Nepal and to the Islamic Institute of Toronto as well has supported Nepal Library Foundation for setting up libraries in the remote villages of Nepal. Since Fall of 2008, Aditya has been involved with the One Laptop Per Child project. He has since then distributed more than 100 laptops to rural village schools in Nepal, including Nuns' Welfare Foundations Arya Tara School. This project is an addition to the hundreds of computers and printers he donated to dozens of schools in Kathmandu valley in Nepal
In 2001, Aditya proposed to develop and fund a world class Institute of Information Technology Nepal (IIT-N) modelled after India's IIT. The institute was to be established within a government sponsored IT Park in the Greater Kathmandu area (Banepa IT Park). Just before the parliament of Nepal was set to approve the proposal, the government fell and proposal was delayed, and later withdrawn by Aditya.

Philanthropic work in India
Aditya has set up a student residence (50 rooms) for children of landless families with integrated education program in India through AIM for SEVA in Bihar, India. In the past, Jha has chaired the India AIDS Campaign within UNICEF Canada's Unite For Children, Unite Against Aids campaign. "As part of the larger Canadian Unite for Children, Unite against AIDS campaign, a special India HIV and AIDS Campaign has been established to support AIDS prevention, awareness and treatment projects for children and youth in India.". Working with Canadian organization 'Aim for Seva', Aditya has donated a 50-student residence for kids from landless families in Bihar, India.

Other Project
Aditya's foundation has also supported other projects: with Ryerson University a research project on Economic Value of Indo-Canadians; Pathways Education Program for the inner-city kids of Regent Park community in Toronto; Share the Music program of Roy Thomson Hall through endowment to give Canadian aboriginal youth access to best musical performances in Toronto; Infrastructure grant for Canadian Youth Ballet Ensemble for ballet school in Havana and Trillium Hospital, Mississauga; Toronto International Film Festival as Gold Patron; Canadian Museum of Human Rights; and Nelson Mandela Children's Fund and several other charitable projects.

Public affairs interests 
Jha is active with Canadian, Indian and Nepalese public affairs. From November 16–18, 2009 he accompanied Canadian Prime Minister Stephen Harper to India as one of the seven members of his Canadian delegation. He is one of the founding directors of the Canada India Foundation where he is currently the National Convener. Prior to this he chaired the 'Educational & Institutional' committee. Most recently, he was instrumental in designing the University of Waterloo and the Canada India Foundation's (CIF) first-of-its-kind joint initiative for the advancement of Canada's research capacity in studying the politics, economy and social conditions of contemporary India and bi-lateral relationship of both countries through a planned establishment of a $10-million endowment.

Aditya moderated Canada session during Pravasi Bhartiya Divas event (Delhi, January 2007) organized by Ministry of Overseas Indian Affairs. He also moderated India Business Roundtable (Toronto, October 2006), jointly organized by Indo-Canada Chamber of Commerce and Department of Foreign Affairs of Canada as well as the roundtable entitled Engaging India: tapping Roots- Seizing Opportunities (Delhi, January 2007) jointly organized with CII, India and ICCC, Canada. Aditya was an official blogger for the Toronto Star's "Your City, My City" series with focus on Toronto's Mayoral race.

Aditya facilitated and helped fund a workshop on 'Opportunities and Challenges For Nepali Political Parties' co-organized by National Democratic Institute (NDI, Washington D.C.) and Nepal Study Center (NSC) of the University of New Mexico (UNM). The workshop provided a forum for thoughtful exchanges on the issues of development and democracy between Nepalese policy/political leaders and their U.S. counterparts.

Arts and culture 
Jha supports the Canadian Youth Ballet Ensemble to promote dance education and training for young Canadians, and the "Share the Music" program of Roy Thomson Hall to give Canadian aboriginal youth access to best musical performances. He also supports Toronto International Film Festival group as Gold Patron. The Toronto International Film Festival Group is a charitable, not-for-profit, cultural organization whose mission is to transform the way people see the world. Its vision is to lead the world in creative and cultural discovery through the moving image. Jha also supports the Canadian Museum for Human Rights.

Awards, recognition and appointments 
On December 30, 2012, Aditya was appointed a Member of the Order of Canada by Governor General David Johnston. The Order of Canada is Canada's highest civilian award. His citation read, "for his achievements in business and for his commitment to promoting education and entrepreneurial opportunities for Aboriginal and disadvantaged youth". On May 8, 2013, he was recognized as Champion of Public Education in Canada by The Learning Partnership, along with scotiabank CEO Richard E. Waugh and The Globe and Mail Editor-in-Chief John Stackhouse. The award recognizes and celebrates the accomplishments of extraordinary Canadians whose lifelong dedication, generosity, and commitment have contributed to making the Canadian public education system one of the best in the world. He is a winner of the Top 25 Canadian Immigrants Award (2010), an inductee of the '30 most influential Indo-Canadians Power List (2009),' and a recipient of Honorary Doctorate of Laws from Ryerson University (now Toronto Metropolitan University), the university's highest honour. Aditya is the former National Convenor of the Canada India Foundation— a public policy organization.

Awards and honours 

 Champion of Public Education in Canada, The Learning Partnership, Canada (2013) 
 Member of the Order of Canada (2012) - Canada's highest civilian honours to recognize a lifetime of outstanding achievement, dedication to community and service to the nation
 Honorary Doctor of Laws (LL.D.), Ted Rogers School of Management, Ryerson University (now Toronto Metropolitan University), Toronto, Ontario, Canada
 Global Indian Award 2011, Global Indian Origin
 Winner, Top 25 Canadian Immigrants 2010
 South Asian Philanthropist of the Year 2011, Mid-Week
 30 most Influential Indo Canadians, Rediff India Abroad magazine's Power List (published September 2009)
 Desi News Grant's Community Achievers Awards (2008)
 Technology Achievement Award (2004), Indo Canada Chamber of Commerce (ICCC)
 CEO award (1998), BCE Inc.
 President's Club (1999), Bell Canada

Appointments 
 Member, Board of Directors, National Capital Commission
 Member of the Order of Canada (2012)
 Member, Board of Directors, Indspire
 Board of Governors, Sheridan Institute of Technology & Advance Learning, Oakville, Ontario, Canada
 Board Member, First Nations Financial Management Board (FNFMB), Government of Canada
 Board Member, Art Gallery of Hamilton, Hamilton, Ontario, Canada
 Entrepreneur-In-Residence, School of Business, Centennial College, Scarborough, Ontario, Canada
 Member of the Board of Governors, Sheridan College of Technology & Advanced Learning
 Entrepreneur in Residence, School of Business, Centennial College
 Advisory Council Member, School of Social Services, Ryerson University (now Toronto Metropolitan University)
 Chair (former), Canada India Foundation
 Board Member (Former), Ontario Investment & Trade Advisory Council (OITAC), Government of Ontario
 Chair (Former), India HIV/AIDS Campaign, UNICEF Canada
 National Convener (former), Canada India Foundation (July 2009- June 2011)
 Board Member (former), PharmEng International Inc. (TSX: PII)
 Board member (former), Brainhunter Inc. (TSX: BH)

Quotes & philosophy
 "In Life, you always get more than what you deserve or less than what you deserve - You never quite get just the right amount. If you get less you must work harder & smarter, and if you get more than you must give back"
 "Empathy starts with actions"
 "Before I became active with 'giving' to charitable causes, I looked at giving as charity to others. Now, I see giving as charity to myself. You are giving to your expanded self, your passion, your talent to make your desired changes and to your obligation to payback to the favorite social circumstances as only those favourable social circumstances allow people like yourself, your kids and for all, that you care about to prosper"
 "Nobel laureate, Herbert Simon estimated that the "social capital" is responsible for at least 90% of what people earn in wealthy societies. I am trying to make a case here that all of us have obligation to give and pay back to that 'Social Capital' and ALL of us can 'SPARE to Give'." [Keynote speech titled 'Giving - A charity to self or others?' at a charity gala]
 "I urge you to seriously think of giving back to the mainstream causes that you are passionate about and try to be active with the causes you give for. It will benefit us tremendously, benefit Canada deservingly and feed our soul well. May I urge you to consider giving every year 10% of what you earn after tax? It is highly doable. We never have enough to spare to give but we can always spare to give. Giving is permanent but accumulation is not. Giving is the right thing to do- it is an obligation." --
 "I would urge all of you to think of philanthropy in a totally different way. It should be integral and well thought part of your entrepreneurial life. Philanthropy Is Not About Doing Good But rather it is "good for you"; "good for others" is just the byproduct." [Speaking to MBA students of various Canadian institutions at a conference titled 'Starting & Managing Successful Venture: A new Canadian's Perspective' in Toronto]
 "Just because you have more or less money, it does not mean you will give more or less. Giving has a state of mind and when you have understood that part, you will give irrespective of how much money you have." [Quoted in the Economist Intelligence Unit April 2010 report titled 'The New World of Wealth-Seven key trends for investing, giving & spending among the very rich' of The Economist magazine ]
 Philanthropy is critical for any civilized society.
 Success is an event, not a state. Therefore, no one can remain successful.
 'What Got Us Here, Won't Take Us there', highlighted that for Canada to stay on the curve of high quality of life and growth, we must focus on the concept of 'demographic dividend' and how effectively Canada engages immigrants and its aboriginal population. Ryerson University Doctorate/convocation speech (read here)

See also 
 Non Resident Indian

References

Sources
 https://web.archive.org/web/20100116190634/http://bihartimes.com/Newsbihar/2010/Jan/Newsbihar13Jan1.html
 Advisor, 180 Smoke Vape store Vaping

External links
 PM plans for ties that bind

Businesspeople from Toronto
Canadian philanthropists
Living people
Delhi University alumni
Jawaharlal Nehru University alumni
Indian emigrants to Canada
Maithil Brahmin
Indian businesspeople
Kendriya Vidyalaya alumni
Year of birth missing (living people)
20th-century Indian businesspeople
21st-century Indian businesspeople